Son Jeong-hyeon (born 25 November 1991) is a South Korean footballer who plays as goalkeeper for Gyeongnam FC.

Career
Lee was selected by Gyeongnam FC in the 2014 K League draft.

References

External links 

1991 births
Living people
Association football goalkeepers
South Korean footballers
Gyeongnam FC players
Asan Mugunghwa FC players
K League 1 players
K League 2 players
People from Geoje
Sportspeople from South Gyeongsang Province